This is a list of schools in Bogotá, Colombia:

 Colegio Colombo Hebreo 
Academia Militar Mariscal Sucre
Abraham Lincoln School
Anglo Colombian School
Aspaen Gimnasio Iragua
Buckingham School
Colegio Abraham Maslow
Colegio Agustiniano Sur
Colegio Agustiniano Ciudad Salitre
Colegio Agustiniano Norte
Colegio Andino - Deutsche Schule
Colegio Anglo Americano
Colegio Americano
Colegio Bertram Roussel
Colegio Bilingue Richmond
Colegio Cafam
Colegio Calatrava
Colegio Campo Alegre
Colegio Castillo Campestre
Colegio CIEDI
Colegio Champagnat
Colegio Charles de Gaulle
Colegio Clara Casas Morales
Colegio Clermont
Colegio Colombo Americano
Colegio de la Presentación Las Ferias
Colegio de la Presentación Luna Park
Colegio de la Presentación Sans Façon
Colegio de la Presentación Centro
Colegio de San Juan Bautista "De La Salle"
Colegio del Sagrado Corazón De Jesus: Bethlemitas
Colegio Del Santo Ángelhm
Colegio Emilio Valenzuela
Colegio El Fontán
Colegio Nueva York
Colegio Franciscano del Virrey Solis
Colegio Gran Bretaña
Colegio Hacienda los Alcaparros
Colegio Helvetia
Colegio Italiano Leonardo da Vinci
Colegio Jordán de Sajonia
Colegio Jose Joaquín Casas
Colegio La Candelaria
Colegio Lope de Vega
Colegio Los Nogales
Colegio Militar Caldas
Colegio Manuela Beltrán
Colegio Nueva Granada
Colegio Nueva Inglaterra
Colegio Richard Wargner
Colegio Rochester
Colegio Salesiano Leon XIII
Colegio San Bartolomé la Merced
Colegio San Carlos
Colegio San FelipeNeri
Colegio San Jorge de Inglaterra
Colegio San Viator
Colegio Santa Franscisca Romana
Colegio Santa Maria
Colegio Santo Tomás de Aquino
Colegio Tierra Nueva
Colegio Tilatau
Colegio Trinidad del Monte
Colegio Inglaterra Real de Chapinero
Fundación Nuevo Marymount
Gimnasio El Hontanar
Gimnasio El Lago
Gimansio La Salle
Gimansio Los Portales
Gimnasio Los Pinos
Gimnasio Los Robles
Gimnasio Campestre La Salette
Gimnasio Campestre
Gimnasio Colombo Británico
Gimnasio de los Cerros
Gimnasio del Norte
Gimnasio Femenino
Gimnasio La Fontana
Gimnasio la Montaña
Gimnasio Los Andes
Gimnasio Los Caobos
Gimnasio Moderno
INEM Francisco José de Paula Santander
Instituto de la Virgen de Fátima
Instituto Alberto Merani
Instituto San Juan de Dios
Instituto Pedagógico Nacional
Knightsbridge Schools International Bogotá
Liceo Boston
Liceo Cambridge
Liceo de Cervantes
Liceo Manantial de Vida Eterna
Liceo Parroquial Sara Zapata
Lycée Français Louis Pasteur
Major Seminary of Bogotá
The English School (Colegio de Inglaterra)
Oakland Colegio Campestre

See also
List of schools in Colombia
Liceo de Colombia (Bilingue)

References

Bogota
Schools in Bogotá
Education in Bogotá